Marcy Lannan is a Canadian voice actress who works for Blue Water Studios in Calgary, Alberta and is part of the Spectacle Blue Studios theatre company.

Background
In 2005, Marcy Lannan graduated from the  University of Calgary's Fine arts program with a major in Drama and has worked with Quest Theatre, The Shakespeare Company, Maple Salsa, Theatre Encounter and The Downstage Theatre Society. Following completion of her acting training at the university, she auditioned for the 2004 anime series My-HiME and was cast as Nao Yuuki.

Outside of voiceover work, she is involved in theatre and coaches aspiring actors. She is also an aerialist and trapeze artist.

Filmography

Anime
Full Moon o Sagashite - Tomoe Maejima, Nurse, Obnoxious Girl
Hunter x Hunter (1999 series) - Machi
My-HiME - Nao Yuuki, Additional voices
My-Otome - Juliet Nao Zhang
My-Otome Zwei - Juliet Nao Zhang
Futari wa Pretty Cure -Chiaki Yabe/Sienna
Strawberry Marshmallow - Co-Worker

Theatre
Lhasa: Land of the Gods 
Macbeth - Witch 
The End Of The World As We Know It

References

External links
Marcy Lannan at aniSearch.com
Marcy Lannan at Crystal Acid

Living people
Canadian stage actresses
Canadian voice actresses
Year of birth missing (living people)